Thiemo de Bakker was the defending champion, but chose not to compete this year.
Éric Prodon won in the final 7–6(1), 6–3, against Jaroslav Pospíšil.

Seeds

Draw

Finals

Top half

Bottom half

References
Main Draw
Qualifying Singles

Brasov Challenger - Singles
BRD Brașov Challenger